"Naucz mnie" is the debut single by Polish singer Sarsa. The song was released as the first single from her debut studio album Zapomnij mi on 30 April 2015, and was written by Sarsa with production by Sarsa along with Tomasz Konfederak.

The single reached number 1 on the Polish Airplay Chart and was certified diamond.

Music video 
A music video to accompany the release of "Naucz mnie" was released on 5 May 2015 through Sarsa's Vevo channel. It was directed by Olga Czyżykiewicz.

Track listing

Charts and certifications

Weekly charts

Year-end charts

Certifications

Awards and nominations

Release history

References

2015 songs
2015 debut singles
Number-one singles in Poland
Sarsa (singer) songs
Universal Music Group singles
Polish-language songs